Albert Kan-Dapaah (born 14 March 1953) is a Ghanaian chartered accountant and politician. He is currently the Minister of National Security. He was appointed by President Nana Addo Danquah Akufo-Addo on 10 January 2017.

Early life and education 
Kan-Dapaah was born on 14 March 1953. He is an Ashanti and hails from Maase-Boaman in the Ashanti Region of Ghana. Albert Kan-Dapaah had his secondary education at Acherensua Secondary School from 1964 to 1969. He then studied Accountancy at the University of Professional Studies (UPS), Accra Legon. He had further Accountancy courses at the North East London Polytechnic, London and the Emile Woolf College of Accountancy.

Career 
Kan-Dapaah worked with Pannel Kerr Forster, a chartered accounting firm as an Audit Senior. He worked in their offices in Monrovia, Liberia and London, UK between 1978 and 1986.  Back in Ghana, he was the head of Audit at the Social Security and National Insurance Trust (SSNIT) from January 1987. In September 1987, he joined the Electricity Corporation of Ghana where he rose from Director of Audit to become Director for Finance, a position he held for six years.

Kan-Dapaah was a partner in Kwesie, Kan-Dapaah and Baah Co., a firm of Chartered Accountants in Accra. He was also managing Consultant of Kan-Dapaah and Associates, a utility consultancy support group. He has also lectured Auditing part-time at the School of Business Administration, University of Ghana and the University of Professional studies.

Politics 
Albert Kan-Dapaah was the Ashanti Regional Representative on the National Council of the New Patriotic Party (NPP) between 1992 and 1996. He was also a member of the Finance and Economic Affairs Committee of the NPP. He won the Afigya-Sekyere seat at the 1996 parliamentary election. He took his seat in January 1997 in opposition and has held his seat in the two subsequent parliamentary elections in 2000 and 2004. He became Minister for Energy in the Kufuor government after the NPP won power in the 2000 elections. During the April 2003 cabinet reshuffle, he became the Minister for Communications and Technology. He became the Minister for Interior during Kufuor's second term.

Elections  
In the year 2000, Kan-Dapaah won the general elections as the member of parliament for the  Afigya Sekyere West  constituency of the Ashanti Region of Ghana. He won on the ticket of the New Patriotic Party. His constituency was a part of the 31 parliamentary seats out of 33 seats won by the New Patriotic Party in that election for the Ashanti Region. The New Patriotic Party won a majority total of 99 parliamentary seats out of 200 seats. He was elected with 10,605 votes out of 14,878 total valid votes cast. This was equivalent to 72.2% of the total valid votes cast. He was elected over Beatrice Aboagye of the National Democratic Congress, S.Osei Yaw of the Convention People's Party, Agyem Vincent of the People's National Convention and Tawiah Joseph of the New Reformed Party. These won 3,806, 129, 82 and 62 votes out of the total valid votes cast respectively. These were equivalent to 25.9%, 0.9%, 0.6%,  and 0.4% respectively of total valid votes cast.

Kan-Dapaah was elected as the member of parliament for the Afigya-Sekyere West constituency of the Ashanti Region of Ghana for the third time in the 2004 Ghanaian general elections. He won on the ticket of the New Patriotic Party. His constituency was a part of the 36 parliamentary seats out of 39 seats won by the New Patriotic Party in that election for the Ashanti Region. The New Patriotic Party won a majority total of 128 parliamentary seats out of 230 seats.  He was elected with 13,936 votes out of 17,863 total valid votes cast equivalent to 78% of total valid votes cast. He was elected over Ampofo Stephen of the Peoples’ National Convention, Joseph Baah of the National Democratic Congress and A.S. Osei Yaw of the Convention People's Party. These obtained 0.8%, 20.1%  and 1% respectively of total valid votes cast.

In 2008, he won the general elections on the ticket of the New Patriotic Party for the same constituency. His constituency was part of the 34 parliamentary seats out of 39 seats won by the New Patriotic Party in that election for the Ashanti Region. The New Patriotic Party won a minority total of 109 parliamentary seats out of 230 seats. He was elected with 13,824 votes out of 18,747 total valid votes cast equivalent to 73.74% of total valid votes cast. He was elected over Joyce Oduro of the Peoples' National Congress, Joseph Baah of the National Democratic Congress and James Gyimah Dabo of the Convention People's Party. These obtained 1.28%, 23.07% and 1.91% respectively of the total votes cast.

Personal life 
Kan-Dapaah is married with four children. He is the uncle of Collins Adomako-Mensah.

Controversy 
On 15 January 2020, a video of a flirtatious WhatsApp video call between Albert Kan-Dapaah and a young woman popped up on social media leading to several calls for his resignation from the position as National Security Minister.

Other positions held 
 1996 - President of the Institute of Chartered Accountants, Ghana 
 1996 - Vice-president, Association of Accountancy Bodies in West Africa

References 

1953 births
Living people
Ghanaian Freemasons
Ghanaian MPs 1997–2001
Ghanaian MPs 2001–2005
Ghanaian MPs 2005–2009
Ghanaian MPs 2009–2013
Communications ministers of Ghana
Defence ministers of Ghana
Energy ministers of Ghana
Interior ministers of Ghana
New Patriotic Party politicians
University of Professional Studies alumni